Cooleemee is a town in Davie County, North Carolina, United States. The population was 940 at the 2020 census.

History
Cooleemee Mill Town Historic District and the Foard-Tatum House are listed on the National Register of Historic Places.

Geography
Cooleemee is located at  (35.814509, -80.556180).

Demographics

2020 census

As of the 2020 United States census, there were 940 people, 379 households, and 270 families residing in the town.

2000 census
As of the census of 2000, there were 905 people, 400 households, and 254 families residing in the town. The population density was 1,166.6 people per square mile (448.0/km2). There were 456 housing units at an average density of 587.8 per square mile (225.7/km2). The racial makeup of the town was 91.71% White, 5.41% African American, 0.33% Native American, 1.10% from other races, and 1.44% from two or more races. Hispanic or Latino of any race were 4.09% of the population.

There were 400 households, out of which 25.5% had children under the age of 18 living with them, 49.3% were married couples living together, 8.5% had a female householder with no husband present, and 36.5% were non-families. 32.8% of all households were made up of individuals, and 18.3% had someone living alone who was 65 years of age or older. The average household size was 2.26 and the average family size was 2.85.

In the town, the population was spread out, with 22.0% under the age of 18, 7.4% from 18 to 24, 26.7% from 25 to 44, 22.7% from 45 to 64, and 21.2% who were 65 years of age or older. The median age was 40 years. For every 100 females, there were 103.8 males. For every 100 females age 18 and over, there were 97.2 males.

The median income for a household in the town was $29,833, and the median income for a family was $37,875. Males had a median income of $26,705 versus $20,813 for females. The per capita income for the town was $17,148. About 9.6% of families and 12.4% of the population were below the poverty line, including 18.6% of those under age 18 and 8.2% of those age 65 or over.

Notable people
Jack Crouch, baseball player
Zeb Eaton, baseball player
Buck Jordan, baseball player

See also
 Cooleemee, an homonymous estate

References

External links
 Official website

Towns in Davie County, North Carolina
Towns in North Carolina